James Xavier Myers (born April 28, 1969) is a former relief pitcher in Major League Baseball who played for the Baltimore Orioles in their 1996 season. Listed at  6' 1", 190 lb., Myers batted and threw right-handed. He was born in Oklahoma City, Oklahoma.

External links
Career statistics and player information from Baseball Reference, or Baseball Reference (Minors), or Retrosheet, or The Baseball Gauge, or Venezuela Winter League

1969 births
Living people
Baltimore Orioles players
Baseball players from Oklahoma
Carolina Mudcats players
Clinton Giants players
Leones del Caracas players
American expatriate baseball players in Venezuela
Major League Baseball pitchers
Memphis Chicks players
Norfolk Tides players
Oklahoma RedHawks players
Phoenix Firebirds players
Pocatello Giants players
Rochester Red Wings players
San Jose Giants players
Scranton/Wilkes-Barre Red Barons players
Shreveport Captains players
Sportspeople from Oklahoma City
American expatriate baseball players in Taiwan
Sinon Bulls players